The Live Desk is an American news and talk program that aired on the Fox News Channel. It was cancelled and replaced with America Live with Megyn Kelly.

About the show
Airing each weekday at 1:00 p.m. ET, it focused on the main news stories of the day the network was following, mostly through live correspondents and pre-taped video, in addition to breaking news.  This show originally aired as a one-hour program when it debuted on September 25, 2006.

Compared to the network's main news programming, half the program aired from one of the network's control rooms, the other half airing from Studio D. The second half also featured a panel, named the A-list, with a special guest panelist, labeled the Wildcard.

Hosted by Martha MacCallum, the program replaced DaySide, which ended on September 22, 2006, due to its hosts leaving the network to begin The Morning Show with Mike and Juliet for Fox.

Revamp
On June 10, 2008, Fox News announced that the show would expand to two hours, with the second hour replacing America's Pulse with E. D. Hill, from June 16. Trace Gallagher joined the program as a co-host.

On May 28, 2009, The Live Desk launched in high definition with new graphics, new music, and the use of HD ready Studio J.

References

External links
 

2000s American television news shows
2010s American television news shows
2006 American television series debuts
2010 American television series endings
Fox News original programming